Kardinia may refer to:

Australia

Queensland 
 Kardinia, Townsville, a heritage house

Victoria 
 Kardinia Park in Geelong, Victoria, Australia
 Kardinia Park (stadium)
 Kardinia Church
 Kardinia International College